Fashion law is a specific field of law that deals with legal issues that impact the fashion industry. Fundamental issues in fashion law include intellectual property, business and finance, with subcategories ranging from employment and labor law to real estate, international trade and government regulation.  Fashion law also includes related areas such as textile production, modeling, media,  cosmetics and perfume industries, questions of safety and sustainability, dress codes and religious apparel, consumer culture, privacy and wearable tech, and civil rights.

History

Fashion has been subject to legal regulation throughout history, from sumptuary laws that limit who can wear certain garments to trade restrictions and varying degrees of intellectual property protection. However, the conceptualization of fashion law as a distinct legal field is relatively recent.

In May 2004, a group of French lawyers led by Annabelle Gauberti published a supplement entitled "Droit du luxe" (which translates into either "law of luxury goods" or "luxury law") in the prestigious French legal magazine Revue Lamy Droit des Affaires. This supplement explored various specific legal and tax issues at stake in the fashion and luxury goods sectors and was the second conceptualization ever of the interactions between the legal field and the fashion and luxury goods industries.

In 2006, Professor Susan Scafidi offered the first course in Fashion Law at Fordham Law School, thus creating a brand new field of law. Fashion Law courses were also developed and offered to designers at the Fashion Institute of Technology (by Guillermo Jimenez) and Parsons School of Design (by Deborah McNamara) at this time as well.

In 2008, Susan Scafidi wrote that fashion law was only then starting to be recognized as a distinct area of law.

In 2010, the world's first academic center dedicated to fashion law, the Fashion Law Institute, launched with the support of Diane von Furstenberg and the Council of Fashion Designers of America. Since then, a number of other institutions around the world have offered courses or programs in the area of fashion law. These include the University of Milan, the University of Insubria, the Instituto Brasileiro de Negócios e Direito da Moda, University at Buffalo Law School, Benjamin N. Cardozo School of Law, New York Law School, New York University, the Fashion Law Project at Loyola Law School, the Moda Hukuku Enstitusu in Turkey, the annual Fashion Law Week at Howard University, and McGill University Faculty of Law.
 
Fashion law has also developed into an established field of practice and study. In 2010, designer-turned-lawyer Brittany Rawlings headed up the first Fashion Law practice group dedicated entirely to issues that arise throughout the life of a fashion business. The New York City Bar Association has had a dedicated Fashion Law Committee since January 2011, and the New York County Lawyer's Association has had a Fashion Law Subcommittee since September 2011.

While double-digit turnover growth is being generated by many companies involved in the fashion and luxury goods sectors, an increasing number of lawsuits are filed in this industry and, as a result, more and more legal practitioners focus their practice on this particular industry and sector. An organization called "The international association of lawyers for the creative industries," or ialci, was founded in 2013 during Paris Fashion Week. The goal of the association is to provide relevant and useful business and legal knowledge as well as solutions regarding the creative industries, including fashion and luxury goods.

Segments of Fashion Law

Intellectual Property

Intellectual property protection has been a substantial legal concern in fashion since the emergence of fashion brands in the 19th century. It has been the subject of congressional debate, multiple academic articles, and the first fashion law blog, as well as a major exhibit at the Fashion Institute of Technology Museum in New York. Key issues include:

the scope of copyright protection,  
trademark infringement and counterfeit goods,
utility patents, particularly in connection with advances in technology, 
the use of design patents as an alternative or supplement to copyright protection, and
comparative international standards.

A prominent related issue has been cultural appropriation, such as the use of Native American or religious designs by commercial fashion brands.

Financing and Corporate Structures

Fashion law encompasses the broad spectrum of issues pertinent to starting and funding a fashion business, such as:

the widespread use of factoring,  
the influx of private equity investment, and 
initial public offerings by major fashion brands.

Manufacturing

Legal issues in the production of clothing and accessories include:

worker safety and other labor practices, 
garment district zoning, and 
source indication.

Marketing

Legal issues addressed in connection with marketing include:

labeling requirements, 
licensing, and
deceptive advertising.

Retail

Legal issues connected with the retail environment include:

consumer data privacy and the security of credit card information, 
discrimination based on racial profiling, and
real-estate leasing and ownership.

Ethics, Sustainability, and Economic Development

Concerns pertaining to fashion ethics, sustainability and economic development have had a substantial impact on the industry, affecting both the legal framework and self-regulation initiatives. Important issues have included: 
 
organic certification, 
greenwashing,
supply-chain monitoring and certification standards, such as the Higg Index and SA8000 certification.
the regulation of digitally altered images,
fair trade fashion, and
the impact of philanthropic initiatives and clothing donation programs.

International Trade

In addition to the international implications of issues noted above, fashion law also addresses other matters connected to international business transactions, including:

grey market goods
import and export quotas,
transfer pricing taxation, and
customs duties.

Modeling Law

The legal status of models has become a prominent issue in fashion law, as exemplified by:

The regulation of models' weight in places, such as Madrid, Milan, and Israel,
New York's enactment of a statute giving underage models protection under the state's child labor law, 
antitrust enforcement in relation to model pay rates, and 
efforts to curb fashion-related human trafficking.

References

Fashion
Business law